The Millinery Shop (1879/86) is a painting by French artist Edgar Degas.  It depicts a woman sitting at a display table in a millinery shop, appearing to closely examine or work on a lady's hat, which she holds in her hands.  The view of the scene is at an angle from above.  Although Degas created several paintings concerning milliners, this painting is his "largest and only 'museum scale work' on this subject".

In the 1940s, the Art Institute of Chicago created Postcards depicting famous artists. The postcard The Millinery Shop, is just one example. Other Art Institute of Chicago postcards can be found in the Wikimedia Commons categories:  French paintings in the Art Institute of Chicago by artist. or  Paintings in the Art Institute of Chicago by artist.

References

Further reading

Life Magazine
The Private Collection of Edgar Degas, Volume 1
Modern Art, 1851-1929: Capitalism and Representation

External links
 
, Art Institute of Chicago

Paintings by Edgar Degas
Paintings in the collection of the Art Institute of Chicago
 1880s paintings
Paintings of women